This uniform polyhedron compound is a composition of the 2 enantiomers of the great inverted snub icosidodecahedron.

References 
.

Polyhedral compounds